Agrahar may refer to:

 Agrahar (Devadurga), a village in Karnataka, India
 Agrahar (Raichur), a village in Karnataka, India